Nergis Kumbasar (born 25 May 1963) is a Turkish model, actress, TV presenter and scenarist.

Life 

Nergis Kumbasar was born on 25 May 1963 in Ankara. She is from İkizdere. Her father Abidin Kumbasar (b. 1932), the son of a family from Rize, is a professor of internal medicine and cardiology. Kumbasar has a younger brother named Deniz. From her father's second marriage to Canan Kumbasar, she has a half-brother named Genco Güralp.

Kumbasar completed her kindergarten in the United States because of her father's studies and works in the country. While attending TED Ankara College Foundation Schools, she was sent to a modeling and grace school by her mother. Then she left her studies in economics at the Ankara Academy of Economics and Commercial Sciences unfinished and began modeling in Istanbul. She would describe this decision as "my greatest regret" in the years to come. She played in many commercials during that period. She made her acting debut in 1985 with the role of Nüzhet on TRT's series Dokuzuncu Hariciye Koğuşu. She also started to work as a TV presenter in the 1980s.

In 1989, Kumbasar married Turkish actor and showman Mehmet Ali Erbil. In 1995, she gave birth to the couple's daughter Yasmin. They divorced in 1996. In 2000, she returned to television with the role of Berna on the TV series Eyvah Kızım Büyüdü. She was involved in various productions in the following years. In 2007, she made her debut as a script writer with the TV series Evimin Erkeği. She later portrayed the character of Neriman on the popular TV series Kiralık Aşk and fantasy series Acemi Cadı of turkish version "Sabrina Teenage Witch", Papatyam.

Filmography

As actress 

Cinema
 Sevmek ve Ölmek Zamanı (1989) - Aysun
 Muhteris Ruhlar (2002) - Rüstem's cousin
 Neva (2013)

Television
 Dokuzuncu Hariciye Koğuşu (1985) - Nüzhet
 Eyvah Kızım Büyüdü (2000) - Berna
 Tam Pansiyon (2004) - Şermin
 Çapkın (2005) - Kevser
 Acemi Cadı (2006–07) - Melda
 Papatyam (2009–11) - Semiha
 Kiralık Aşk (2015–17) - Neriman İplikçi
 O Ses Türkiye Yılbaşı Özel (2016) - Herself
 Darısı Başımıza (2018) - Canan Tekinsoy
 İyi Günde Kötü Günde (2020) - Perihan
 Sihirli Annem (2021) - Perihan
 Seversin (2022) - Suzan

Commercials
 Lipton (2016)
 Signal (2016)

As scenarist 

Television
 Evimin Erkeği (2007)
 Sardunya Sokağı (2007)

As presenter 

Television
 Yeniden Başlasın (2008)
 Nergis Zamanı (2018–19)

References

External links 

 

1963 births
Living people
People from İkizdere
TED Ankara College Foundation Schools alumni
Turkish television actresses
Turkish film actresses
Turkish female models
Turkish female screenwriters